Golden Night is a 1976 French drama film directed by Serge Moati and starring Klaus Kinski.

Plot
A man who was considered dead returns in order to get back at those enemies who tried to kill him off.

Cast
 Bernard Blier as Commissaire Pidoux
 Klaus Kinski as Michel Fournier
 Marie Dubois as Véronique
 Jean-Luc Bideau as Henri Fournier
 Charles Vanel as Charles Fournier
 Anny Duperey as Andrée
 Elisabeth Flickenschildt as Anna, Michel's mother
 Raymond Bussières as Charron, a gambler
 Valérie Pascale as Catherine, the little girl
 Maurice Ronet as Henry aka Nuit d'or

References

External links

1976 films
1970s thriller films
Films about dysfunctional families
Films directed by Serge Moati
1970s French-language films
French thriller films
French films about revenge
German films about revenge
Films about gambling
German thriller films
1970s French films
1970s German films